Ben Welden (born Benjamin Weinblatt; June 12, 1901 – October 17, 1997) was an American character actor who played a wide variety of Damon Runyon-type gangsters in various movies and television shows.

Early years
Welden was born in Toledo, Ohio.  He served in the U.S. Army during World War II.

Career
Welden's film debut occurred in the British production The Man from Chicago (1930). After freelancing for several years, he signed with Warner Bros. in 1937.

Short, balding and somewhat rotund, Welden often literally played a "heavy", frequently in a somewhat comical or slightly dim-witted way, offsetting the sinister nature of his character's actions. Among his roles in this vein was The Big Sleep (1946).

Fans of Adventures of Superman remember him well, as he appeared in eight episodes, always as a different character and yet really the same character, in a way. His best-known Superman episode might be "Flight to the North", in which he tries (and fails) to outwit a country-bumpkin type (played by Chuck Connors). In 1966, he acted in episodes 47 and 48 of Batman featuring Vincent Price as Special Guest Villain "Egghead".  He also played a supporting role in the Three Stooges short, "Three Dark Horses." (1952)

He appeared in six episodes of The Lone Ranger ("Two Gold Lockets", 1951, "Delayed Action", 1952,  "Right to Vote", 1953, "Stage to Tishomingo", 1954, "Trouble at Tylerville", 1956, & "Outlaws in Greasepaint", 1957). He continued to work in television until 1966.

Personal life

After retiring from the screen, Welden owned a confection company called Nutcorn, located in Beverly Hills.

Death
Welden died at age 96 on October 17, 1997, at the Motion Picture & Television Country House and Hospital in Woodland Hills, California.

Filmography

 The Man from Chicago (1930) - Ted (film debut)
 Big Business (1930) - Fenchurch
 77 Park Lane (1931) - Sinclair
 The Missing Rembrandt (1932) - Pinkerton Agent (uncredited)
 The Innocents of Chicago (1932) - Spike Guinan
 Tin Gods (1932) - Cyrus P. Schroeder
 His Lordship (1932) - Washington Roosevelt Lincoln
 Born Lucky (1933) - Harriman
 His Grace Gives Notice (1933) - Michael Collier
 This Is the Life (1933) - Two Gun Mullins
 Mannequin (1933) - Chris Dempson
 The Pride of the Force (1933) - Tony Carlotti
 The Medicine Man (1933) - Joe Garbel
 Their Night Out (1933) - Crook
 Send 'em Back Half Dead (1933) - Mustapha
 Puppets of Fate (1933)
 Mr. Quincey of Monte Carlo (1933) - Grover Jones
 Home, Sweet Home (1933) - Santos
 General John Regan (1933) - Billing
 The Black Abbot (1934) - Charlie Marsh
 The River Wolves (1934) - Flash Lawson
 The Fire Raisers (1934) - Bellini - Stedding's Henchman (uncredited)
 The Man Who Changed His Name (1934) - Jerry Muller
 Aunt Sally (1934) - Casino
 Gay Love (1934) - Ben
 The Big Splash (1935) - Crook
 The Triumph of Sherlock Holmes (1935) - Ted Balding
 Annie, Leave the Room! (1935) - Raisins
 Royal Cavalcade (1935) - Businessman
 Death on the Set (1935) - Freshman
 Alibi Inn (1935) - Saunders
 Admirals All (1935) - Adolph Klotz
 The Mystery of the Mary Celeste (1935) - Boas 'Sailor' Hoffman
 Come Out of the Pantry (1935) - Tramp
 Trust the Navy (1935) - Scar
 The Improper Duchess (1936) - Macabe
 The Avenging Hand (1936) - Slug Clarke (uncredited)
 She Knew What She Wanted (1936) - Chester
 The Man Who Could Work Miracles (1936) - San Francisco Reporter (uncredited)
 Hot News (1936) - Slug Wilson
 Westbound Mail (1937) - Steve Hickman
 The Great Barrier (1937) - Joe
 Maytime (1937) - Student (uncredited)
 The King and the Chorus Girl (1937) - First Waiter (uncredited)
 Marked Woman (1937) - Charlie Delaney
 Kid Galahad (1937) - Buzz Barett
 Another Dawn (1937) - Victor Romkoff - Tobacco Tycoon (uncredited)
 Confession (1937) - Defense Attorney
 That Certain Woman (1937) - Headwaiter Harry Aqueilli (uncredited)
 Varsity Show (1937) - Hammer
 Back in Circulation (1937) - Sam Sherman
 Love Is on the Air (1937) - 'Nicey' Ferguson
 Alcatraz Island (1937) - 'Red' Carroll
 The Great Garrick (1937) - Blacksmith at Turk's Head (uncredited)
 The Last Gangster (1937) - Bottles Bailey (uncredited)
 The Duke Comes Back (1937) - Barney
 Missing Witnesses (1937) - Frank Wagner
 Love and Hisses (1937) - Bugsy (uncredited)
 City Girl (1938) - Blake's Valet (uncredited)
 Happy Landing (1938) - Manager Skating Rink
 Prison Nurse (1938) - Gaffney
 Mystery House (1938) - Gerald Frawley
 The Saint in New York (1938) - Boots Papinoff
 Always Goodbye (1938) - 1st New York Taxi Driver
 Crime Ring (1938) - Nate
 Gateway (1938) - Motorboat Man (uncredited)
 Smashing the Rackets (1938) - Whitey Clark
 Tenth Avenue Kid (1938) - Marty Dayton
 Time Out for Murder (1938) - Lefty (uncredited)
 Straight, Place and Show (1938) - Promoter
 The Night Hawk (1938) - Otto Miller
 Up the River (1938) - Coach Larkin (uncredited)
 Little Orphan Annie (1938) - Spot McGee
 The Girl Downstairs (1938) - Policeman (uncredited)
 Federal Man-Hunt (1938) - Goldie
 Stand Up and Fight (1939) - Foreman (uncredited)
 The Lone Wolf Spy Hunt (1939) - Jenks
 Pardon Our Nerve (1939) - Captain of Waiters (uncredited)
 I Was a Convict (1939) - Rocks Henry
 Sergeant Madden (1939) - Henchman Stemmy
 Boys' Reformatory (1939) - Mike Hearn
 Rose of Washington Square (1939) - Toby
 Fugitive at Large (1939) - Convict (uncredited)
 The Star Maker (1939) - Joe Gimlick
 Hollywood Cavalcade (1939) - Agent
 The Roaring Twenties (1939) - Tavern Proprietor (uncredited)
 The Earl of Chicago (1940) - Silky's Driver (uncredited)
 Wolf of New York (1940) - Owney McGill
 Outside the Three-Mile Limit (1940) - Lefty Shores
 Tear Gas Squad (1940) - Sully, Rocks' Partner (uncredited)
 Passport to Alcatraz (1940) - Bender
 South of Pago Pago (1940) - Grimes
 City for Conquest (1940) - Cobb
 The Strawberry Blonde (1941) - Reluctant Convict Dental Patient (uncredited)
 Mr. District Attorney (1941) - Monk Westman (uncredited)
 Knockout (1941) - Pelky
 Men of Boys Town (1941) - Superintendent
 Strange Alibi (1941) - Durkin
 I'll Wait for You (1941) - Dr. Anderson
 Manpower (1941) - Al Hurst
 Nine Lives Are Not Enough (1941) - Moxie Karper
 Fiesta (1941) - Policeman (uncredited)
 Dangerously They Live (1941) - Eddie
 All Through the Night (1942) - Smitty
 A Close Call for Ellery Queen (1942) - Watchman
 Bullet Scars (1942) - Pills Davis
 Maisie Gets Her Man (1942) - Percy Podd
 Highways by Night (1942) - Tony Delewese (uncredited)
 Secrets of the Underground (1942) - Henchman Joe
 Stand by for Action (1942) - Chief Quartermaster Rankin
 Here Comes Elmer (1943) - Louis Burch
 The Fighting Seabees (1944) - Yump Lumkin
 The Desert Hawk (1944, Serial) - Omar, the Beggar
 Shadows in the Night (1944) - Nick Kallus
 Circumstantial Evidence (1945) - Kenny
 It's in the Bag! (1945) - Monty - Bookie
 The Missing Corpse (1945) - 'Slippery Joe' Clary
 Midnight Manhunt (1945) - Hotel Manager (uncredited)
 Follow That Woman (1945) - Joe (uncredited)
 Cinderella Jones (1946) - Truck Driver (uncredited)
 Dangerous Business (1946) - Moxie (uncredited)
 Anna and the King of Siam (1946) - Third Judge (uncredited)
 The Last Crooked Mile (1946) - Haynes
 The Big Sleep (1946) - Pete, Mars' flunky (uncredited)
 Angel on My Shoulder (1946) - Shaggsy (uncredited)
 Mr. Hex (1946) - Bull Laguna
 The Man I Love (1947) - Jack Atlas (uncredited)
 Sinbad the Sailor (1947) - Commoner (uncredited)
 Hit Parade of 1947 (1947) - Mr. French (uncredited)
 Too Many Winners (1947) - Gil Madden / Theodore Ross
 Fiesta (1947) - Policeman (uncredited)
 Little Miss Broadway (1947) - Cash Monahan
 Blackmail (1947) - Bartender (uncredited)
 Killer Dill (1947) - Big Nick Moronie
 The Pretender (1947) - Mickie
 Heading for Heaven (1947) - Sam
 Here Comes Trouble (1948) - Rankin (uncredited)
 The Noose Hangs High (1948) - Stewart (uncredited)
 Trapped by Boston Blackie (1948) - Louis (uncredited)
 The Dude Goes West (1948) - Porgy (uncredited)
 Jinx Money (1948) - Benny the Meatball
 The Vicious Circle (1948) - Constable
 The Babe Ruth Story (1948) - Bartender (scenes deleted)
 Lady at Midnight (1948) - Willie Gold
 Smart Girls Don't Talk (1948) - Nelson Clark (uncredited)
 A Song Is Born (1948) - Monte
 My Dear Secretary (1948) - Bookie (uncredited)
 Appointment with Murder (1948) - Martin Minecci
 Fighting Fools (1949) - Lefty Conlin
 Impact (1949) - Moving Van Helper
 Search for Danger (1949) - Gregory
 Sorrowful Jones (1949) - Big Steve's Bodyguard
 The Doctor and the Girl (1949) - Patient (uncredited)
 Prison Warden (1949) - Yardbird with Cards (uncredited)
 Mary Ryan, Detective (1949) - Sammy (uncredited)
 Tough Assignment (1949) - Sniffy
 Tell It to the Judge (1949) - Augie (uncredited)
 Riders in the Sky (1949) - Dave
 The Threat (1949) - Tony Anzio (uncredited)
 Buccaneer's Girl (1950) - Tom
 The Jackie Robinson Story (1950) - Tough Lodge Member in Stands (uncredited)
 On the Isle of Samoa (1950) - Nick Leach
 The Desert Hawk (1950) - Mokar (uncredited)
 The Misadventures of Buster Keaton (1950) - Sam (uncredited)
 My True Story (1950) - Buzz Edwards
 The Lemon Drop Kid (1951) - Singing Solly
 Tales of Robin Hood (1951) -  Friar Tuck
 Mask of the Avenger (1951) - Tavern Loafer (uncredited)
 The Lady and the Bandit (1951) - Barkeep in Pub (uncredited)
 Rhubarb (1951) - Oily Moe - Bookie (uncredited)
 Night Stage to Galveston (1952) - Arresting Patrolman (uncredited)
 Captain Pirate (1952) - Martinique Policeman (uncredited)
 Tropical Heat Wave (1952) - Abbot (uncredited)
 Three Dark Horses (1952, Short) - Jim Digger
 All Ashore (1953) - Hugo - Bartender
 Thunder Bay (1953) - Fisherman (uncredited)
 The Veils of Bagdad (1953) - Stout Wrestler (uncredited)
 Killers from Space (1954) - Pilot - Tar Baby 2
 The Steel Cage (1954) - Mike, Convict (segment "The Face")
 Ma and Pa Kettle at Waikiki (1955) - Shorty Bates - Kidnapper (uncredited)
 The Adventures of Captain Africa (1955) - Omar
 The Benny Goodman Story (1956) - Sammy - Primo's 1st Henchman (uncredited)
 Hidden Guns (1956) - Ben Peabody
 Hollywood or Bust (1956) - Boss (uncredited)
 Spook Chasers (1957) - Ziggie
 Night Passage (1957) - Pete (uncredited)
 The Crooked Circle (1957) - Ring Announcer (final film) (uncredited)

References

External links

1901 births
1997 deaths
American male film actors
Male actors from Ohio
20th-century American male actors